Go Figure is a 2005 Disney Channel Original Movie, starring Jordan Hinson. Walt Disney Records released the Go Figure soundtrack on June 7, featuring the title track by Everlife alongside a music video.

Plot
A talented young teenage figure skater named Katelin Kingsford dreams of being a champion. During one of her competitions, she is discovered by a famous Russian skating coach, Natasha Goberman. However, Natasha coaches at an expensive boarding school and Katelin's parents cannot afford to send her there. To help Katelin with the expenses, Natasha convinces the girls hockey team coach to give the last hockey scholarship to Katelin so she can train at the boarding school. Katelin is overjoyed and excited to be taught by Natasha but quickly learns that juggling hockey practice, skate club practice, and her homework is much harder than she imagined. A student assistant coach for the hockey team named Spencer constantly ridicules her, and her fellow skaters in the figure skating club are just as rude. Katelin is also forced to hide all of her precious figure-skating-related belongings, as the hockey coach warns her that the girls on the hockey team despise "twirl girls". However, Katelin does find some consolation in her roommate, Hollywood Henderson, a fellow hockey player. She finds out that Katelin is a figure skater, but promises not to tell anyone.

Katelin faces several obstacles in her new life. Pamela, a figure skater jealous of Katelin's skill and Natasha's obvious liking towards her, locks her in the janitor's closet during a party and sets a trap for her to end up having a can of purple paint dumped on her. Due to this, Katelin loses a private training session with one of her idols, Kristi Yamaguchi, to Pamela, causing Natasha to feel great disappointment towards Katelin. Her teammates on the hockey team turn on her after their first game, when Katelin did not block for the team captain and caused her to be tackled by the opposing team. Katelin works hard to improve, but is overpowered and feels like quitting.

Katelin begins flunking her schoolwork as well. Combined with the hostility of the hockey team, the stress gets to her and she gets on a bus home. When she arrives at her house, she finds that her parents have packed up all of her things in boxes. Feeling unwanted, Katelin grabs a box of her ice skating things and runs out of the house. As she sits on a bench and rummages through her belongings, she finds that her mother was a "twirl girl" as well when she sees a picture of her mother on the ice and prizes from various competitions in the box. After talking with her mother, Katelin decides that she's not going to quit no matter how hard things may seem, and she goes back to school.

A great change occurs in Katelin. She pushes herself harder now to do her best in everything, including hockey. She is the first to arrive for practice and she improves greatly. Katelin spends a lot of time studying and her grades improve drastically. She spends hours practicing both hockey and figure skating alone.  Spencer, who overheard a conversation between Natasha and the hockey coach, knows that Katelin is a figure skater and admires her even more for it due to her drastic improvement. In their first game of the season, Katelin's practice pays off when she helps her team win. With Katelin, the girls hockey team is suddenly on a winning streak. She starts to teach the hockey team about balancing with ballet, and uses her brother's ice hockey tactics to improve their team's performance, bringing the team to the finals for the first time in seven years.

Later on, when the coach announces the date of the finals, Katelin realizes that it is also the same day as the Senior Nationals, an event that scouts for potential Olympic figure skaters. She is extremely confused and has no idea what she should do. Spencer, Hollywood, and Natasha all push her to go to the Nationals, as Hollywood insists that Katelin won't be able to skate in the Olympics if she doesn't go to the competition. However, Katelin still feels conflicted, as she feels that she will be letting down her teammates on the hockey team. In the end, Katelin shows up at the hockey game, much to Spencer's disbelief. They lose the finals by one goal, but the team is far from disappointed, saying that they were happy to have made it into the finals and that they will have another chance next season.

Spencer gathers all of Katelin's figure skating equipment and takes her to the Senior Nationals, but her suitcase falls open in front of the hockey team before they can make it out and they see all of her stuffed animals and dresses. Katelin runs away in embarrassment. In the car, Spencer gives her the dress. "It's perfect," Katelin exclaims before kissing Spencer on the cheek. While getting ready, Katelin realizes that one of her skates is missing, and that it must have fallen out when she was running in a hurry. She tells Natasha that she will skate in her hockey skates instead, but that fails when she falls right in the beginning of her skating routine. However, the entire hockey team arrives with her missing skate. Natasha tries to get the judges to let her restart, but when they refuse, the hockey team starts a chant of "Let her skate!", which soon echoes throughout the entire stadium. The judges relent and allow Katelin another chance to perform. She does a wonderful job on her routine. The hockey team rushes forward at the end of her performance and hoists her onto her shoulders. Spencer gives her a large bouquet of flowers. The judges announce that Katelin has made it into the US Olympic team, and the movie ends with Katelin waving and smiling.

Cast
 Jordan Hinson as Katelin Kingsford
 Brittany Curran as Pamela
 Whitney Sloan as Amy "Hollywood" Henderson
 Cristine Rose as Natasha Goberman
 Ryan Malgarini as Bradley Kingsford
 Tania Gunadi as Mary "Mojo" Johnson
 Amy Halloran as Ronnie
 Sabrina Speer as Shelby Singer
 Jake Abel as Spencer
 Kristi Yamaguchi as Herself
 Jodi Russell as Linda Kingsford
 Curt Dousett as Ed Kingsford
 Paul Kiernan as Coach Reynolds
 Morgan Lund as Bob
 Austin Jepson as Hooner
 Anne Sward as Ginger
 Kadee Leishman as Heather

Soundtrack

The soundtrack was released on June 7, 2005 in the United States. It peaked at number 23 on the Billboard Top Kid Audio.

Track listing
Everlife - "Go Figure" – 4:08
Bowling for Soup - "Greatest Day" – 3:13
Caleigh Peters - "I Can Do Anything" – 3:42
Brie Larson - "She Said" – 3:44
Hope 7 - "I Want Everything" – 2:54
Superchic(k) - "Anthem" – 2:51
Raven-Symoné - "Life Is Beautiful" – 3:16
Cadence Grace - "Crash Goes My World" – 3:03
Junk - "Life Is Good" – 3:10

Awards
Go Figure was nominated in the Young Artist Awards for Best Television Movie or Special.

References

External links
 
 

2005 television films
2005 films
Disney Channel Original Movie films
American teen comedy-drama films
2000s teen comedy-drama films
Figure skating films
American ice hockey films
2005 soundtrack albums
Television soundtracks
Films shot in Utah
2000s English-language films
Films about women's sports
Films directed by Francine McDougall
American comedy-drama television films
2000s American films